Hideo Ōba (大庭 秀雄, Ōba Hideo, 28 February 1910 - 10 March 1997) was a Japanese film director and screenwriter.

Life 
Ōba was born on 28 February 1910, in Aoyama, Akasaka-ku, Tokyo.

After graduating from Keio University's Department of Japanese Studies, Ōba started working at Shochiku. There he became an assistant director to film director Yasushi Sasaki, and made his debut as a director in 1939 with the film Otto no kachi. A year before his directorial debut, he wrote Ai yori Ai he as a screenwriter.

In 1953, Ōba made Kazuo Kikuta's radio drama Kimi no na ha aired on NHK into a movie, which became a major hit. Kimi no na ha continued as a movie trilogy until 1954.

In his later years, he taught at the Japan Institute of the Moving Image.

Ōba died on 10 March 1997, at the age of 87.

Selected filmography 

 Otto no kachi (1939)
 Hana ha itsuwarazu (1941)
 Musume (1943)
 Kikyo (1950)

 Nagasaki no kane (1950)
 Kimi no na ha trilogy (1953-1954)
 Anata to tomoni (1955)
 Ejima ikushima (1955)
 Me no kabe (1958)
 Aru rakujitsu (1959)
 Zangiku monogatari (1963)
 Yukiguni (1965)
 Yokoborigawa (1966)
 Haru biyori (1967)

References 

1910 births
1997 deaths
Japanese film directors